Claire Wallace may refer to:
 Claire Wallace (sociologist)
 Claire Wallace (broadcaster)